This was the first edition of the tournament.

Alison Bai and Aleksandrina Naydenova won the title, defeating Natalija Kostić and Nika Kukharchuk in the final, 6–4, 0–6, [10–6].

Seeds

Draw

Draw

References
Main Draw

ITF Women's Circuit – Baotou - Doubles